Wang Ya Nan (29 October 1984) is a Chinese former professional boxer who competed from 2006 to 2009. During her career, from which she retired an undefeated world champion, she held the WIBA middleweight title from 2007 to 2009 and the WBC female middleweight title from 2008 to 2009.

Professional career
In January 2008, Wang became the first Chinese fighter to win the WBC middleweight female world title, defeating Janaya Davis by unanimous decision after 10 rounds.

On her first title defense, Wang defeated American boxer Akondaye Fountain. Wang won the bout, held on 7 November 2008 at the Sichuan Gymnasium in Chengdu, China.

Wang retired as undefeated middleweight champion after defeating  Kenian Charity Mukami in a fight held in Malvern.

Wang resides in Melbourne, Australia.

Professional boxing record

External links

References

1984 births
Living people
Middleweight boxers
Chinese women boxers
World Boxing Council champions
Women's International Boxing Association champions
Undefeated world boxing champions